Hybomitra expollicata, also known as the striped horsefly, is a Palearctic species of horse fly in the family Tabanidae.

References

External links
Images representing Hybomitra expollicata
Martin C. Harvey , 2018 Key to genus Hybomitra

Tabanidae
Diptera of Asia
Diptera of Europe
Insects described in 1883
Taxa named by Louis Pandellé